In probability theory and statistics, the Gumbel distribution (also known as the type-I generalized extreme value distribution) is used to model the distribution of the maximum (or the minimum) of a number of samples of various distributions.

This distribution might be used to represent the distribution of the maximum level of a river in a particular year if there was a list of maximum values for the past ten years. It is useful in predicting the chance that an extreme earthquake, flood or other natural disaster will occur. The potential applicability of the Gumbel distribution to represent the distribution of maxima relates to extreme value theory, which indicates that it is likely to be useful if the distribution of the underlying sample data is of the normal or exponential type. This article uses the Gumbel distribution to model the distribution of the maximum value. To model the minimum  value, use the negative of the original values.

The Gumbel distribution is a particular case of the generalized extreme value distribution (also known as the Fisher–Tippett distribution). It is also known as the log-Weibull distribution and the double exponential distribution (a term that is alternatively sometimes used to refer to the Laplace distribution). It is related to the Gompertz distribution: when its density is first reflected about the origin and then restricted to the positive half line, a Gompertz function is obtained.

In the latent variable formulation of the multinomial logit model — common in discrete choice theory — the errors of the latent variables follow a Gumbel distribution. This is useful because the difference of two Gumbel-distributed random variables has a logistic distribution.

The Gumbel distribution is named after Emil Julius Gumbel (1891–1966), based on his original papers describing the distribution.

Definitions
The cumulative distribution function of the Gumbel distribution is

Standard Gumbel distribution

and probability density function  

The cumulants, for n > 1, are given by

Properties

,
where  is the Euler–Mascheroni constant.

The standard deviation  is  hence  

At the mode, where , the value of  becomes , irrespective of the value of

Related distributions
 If  has a Gumbel distribution, then the conditional distribution of Y = −X given that Y is positive, or equivalently given that X is negative, has a Gompertz distribution. The cdf G of Y is related to F, the cdf of X, by the formula  for y > 0. Consequently, the densities are related by : the Gompertz density is proportional to a reflected Gumbel density, restricted to the positive half-line.
 If X is an exponentially distributed variable with mean 1, then −log(X) has a standard Gumbel distribution.
 If  are independent, then . Note that . More generally, the distribution of linear combinations of independent Gumbel random variables can be approximated by GNIG and GIG distributions.
Theory related to the generalized multivariate log-gamma distribution provides a multivariate version of the Gumbel distribution.

Occurrence and applications

Gumbel has shown that the maximum value (or last order statistic) in a sample of random variables following an exponential distribution minus the natural logarithm of the sample size   approaches the Gumbel distribution as the sample size increases.

So the cumulative distribution of the maximum value  satisfies

and, for large , the right-hand-side converges to 

In hydrology, therefore, the Gumbel distribution is used to analyze such variables as monthly and annual maximum values of daily rainfall and river discharge volumes, and also to describe droughts.
 
Gumbel has also shown that the estimator  for the probability of an event — where r is the rank number of the observed value in the data series and n is the total number of observations — is an unbiased estimator of the cumulative probability around the mode of the distribution. Therefore, this estimator is often used as a plotting position.

In number theory, the Gumbel distribution approximates the number of terms in a random partition of an integer as well as the trend-adjusted sizes of maximal prime gaps and maximal gaps between prime constellations.

Gumbel reparametrization tricks 
In machine learning, the Gumbel distribution is sometimes employed to generate samples from the categorical distribution. This technique is called "Gumbel-max trick" and is a special example of "reparametrization tricks".

In detail, let  be nonnegative, and not all zero, and let  be independent samples of Gumbel(0, 1), then by routine integration,That is, 

Equivalently, given any , we can sample from its Boltzmann distribution by

Related equations include:
 If , then .
 .
 . That is, the Gumbel distribution is a max-stable distribution family.

Random variate generation

Since the quantile function (inverse cumulative distribution function), of a Gumbel distribution is given by

the variate  has a Gumbel distribution with parameters  and  when the random variate  is drawn from the uniform distribution on the interval .

Probability paper

In pre-software times probability paper was used to picture the Gumbel distribution (see illustration). The paper is based on linearization of the cumulative distribution function  :
 
In the paper the horizontal axis is constructed at a double log scale. The vertical axis is linear. By plotting  on the horizontal axis of the paper and the -variable on the vertical axis, the distribution is represented by a straight line with a slope 1. When distribution fitting software like CumFreq became available, the task of plotting the distribution was made easier, as is demonstrated in the section below.

See also
 Type-2 Gumbel distribution
 Extreme value theory
 Generalized extreme value distribution
 Fisher–Tippett–Gnedenko theorem
 Emil Julius Gumbel

References

External links 

Continuous distributions
Extreme value data
Location-scale family probability distributions